This article is a summary of the closing milestones of the Dow Jones Industrial Average, a United States stock market index. Since first closing at 62.76 on February 16, 1885, the Dow Jones Industrial Average has increased, despite several periods of decline.

Milestone highs and lows 
Like most other stock market indices, the Dow undergoes periods of general increase and general declines or stagnation.  A bull market is a term denoting a period of price increases, while a bear market denotes a period of declines. Wall Street generally considers a bear market in session when multiple broad market indices have a downturn of 20% or more in value lasting for at least 2 months.

There are two types of bull markets. A secular bull market is a period in which the stock market index is continually reaching all-time highs with only brief periods of correction, as during the 1990s, and can last upwards of 15 years. A cyclical bull market is a period in which the stock market index is reaching 52-week or multi-year highs and may briefly peak at all-time highs before a rapid decline, as in the early 1970s. It usually occurs within relatively longer bear markets and lasts about three years.

The following are the secular bull and bear markets experienced by the Dow since its inception:
 1885–1890: Bull market. From its first close of 62.76 on February 16, 1885, the Dow rises steadily for five years, until reaching a peak of 78.38 on June 4, 1890. This record would stand for nearly 15 years, until the Dow closed at 79.27 on March 24, 1905.
 1890–1896: Bear market. The Dow plunges over 63% over the next six years, to set an all-time low of 28.48, on August 8, 1896.
 1896–1906: Bull market. After setting an all-time low during the summer of 1896, the Dow quickly erases these losses, and eventually reaches a peak of 103.00 on January 19, 1906.
 1906–1915: Bear market. The Dow loses 48.5% of its value over the next 22 months, before reaching a low of 53.00 on November 15, 1907. From 1906 to 1915, the Dow remains stuck trading between 53 and 103. The index reaches a secondary low of 53.17 on December 24, 1914.
 1915–1919: Bull market. After hitting a seven-year low in late 1914, the Dow rises 125% over the next five years, reaching a new high of 119.62 on November 3, 1919.
 1919–1921: Bear market. The Dow loses 46.6% of its value in just over 21 months, before reaching a low of 63.90 on August 24, 1921.
 1921–1929: Bull market. Over the next eight years, the Dow increases nearly 500%, and eventually grows to a closing high of 381.17 on September 3, 1929.
 1929–1949: Bear market. The stock market crash of 1929, or Black Tuesday, precedes, as well as causes the Great Depression. The Dow plunges 89% to 41.22 on July 8, 1932, thus erasing 33 years of gains, in just under three years. Although cyclical bull markets occur in the 1930s and 1940s, the index takes 22 years to surpass its previous highs.
 1949–1966: Bull market. The Dow posts impressive growth in the booming economy following the Second World War. Starting from  161.60 in June 1949, when P/E ratios reach multi-decade lows, the index ends just five points below 1,000 on February 9, 1966. The inflation-adjusted high set on December 31, 1965 would not be surpassed for nearly 30 years, until the Dow's first close above 4,700 on July 7, 1995.
 1966–1982: Bear market. Traders deal with a stagnant economy in an inflationary monetary environment. The Dow enters two long downturns in 1970 and 1974; during the latter, it falls 45% to the bottom of a 20-year range. Three short-lived cyclical bull markets occurred during this period, each of which lasted no more than two years.
 1982–2000: Bull market. The Dow experiences its most spectacular rise in history. From a meager 776.92 on August 12, 1982, the index grows 1,409% to close at 11,722.98 by January 14, 2000, without any major reversals except for a brief but severe downturn in Black Monday, 1987, which includes the largest daily percentage loss in Dow history.
 2000–2003: Bear market. The index meanders, and then plunges 38%, to a closing low of 7,286.27 on October 9, 2002.
 2003–2007: Bull market. A cyclical bull closing peak of 14,164.53, reached exactly five years later, does not surpass the inflation-adjusted high set on December 31, 1999.
 2007–2009: Bear market. A renewed bear is recognized in summer 2008 and multiple volatility records are set that autumn. Such volatility would not return until 2020, when the Dow recorded several trading days with point swings of at least 1,000 points, alternating between losses and gains like in fall 2008. Another acute phase in early 2009 brings the index to a new 12½ year closing low of 6,547.05, on March 9, 2009, for a total loss of 54% in 17 months.
 2009–2020: Bull market. The Dow remains volatile during its ensuing climb, losing almost 20% during the summers of 2010 and 2011, however, by February 1, 2013, the index finally closes above 14,000 for the first time since October 2007. The Dow continues upward to surpass its prior all-time record on March 5, 2013 and, by the end of 2013, sets a new all-time inflation-adjusted high for the first time since the end of 1999. For the remainder of the decade, Dow Jones, NASDAQ, and S&P 500 faced some corrections that nearly ended the bull run, but ultimately towered above several millenary milestones by the end of 2019. The ongoing COVID-19 pandemic, along with the current oil-price war between Russia and Saudi Arabia, terminated the long bull market.
 March–November 2020: Bear market. The long bull run came to an end during the coronavirus pandemic. Ending after just 8 months, this was the shortest bear market in 30 years.
 2020-2022: Bull market. After a quick recovery from the first bear market in over a decade, the Dow rallied near 37,000, but plunged during the 2022 stock market decline, widely attributed to financial stimulus packages designed to stabilize the economy following COVID-19 recession. However, the relief proved to be futile and fueled inflation, resulting in aggressive interest rate hikes to "deflate" the economy under control.

Records 

As indicated above, an all-time low was 28.48, on August 8, 1896.

Incremental closing milestones 
The following is a list of the milestone closing levels of the Dow Jones Industrial Average.

Legend:

 1-point increments are used up to the 20-point level,
 2-point increments up to the 50-point level,
 5-point increments up to the 100-point level,
 10-point increments up to the 500-point level,
 20-point increments up to the 1,000-point level,
 50-point increments up to the 3,000-point level,
100-point increments up to the 10,000-point level,
200-point increments up to the 20,000-point level and
500 point increments thereafter.

Bold formatting is applied every 5 milestones.

The Late 19th Century Bull Market (1885–1890)

The Century Turnover Bull Market (1896–1906)

The 1910s Bull Market (1916)

The 1920s Bull Market (1924–1929)

Great Depression/World War II (1929–1954) 
 During the Great Depression (1929–1937) 
After reaching an intra-day low of 40.56 on July 8, 1932, the Dow started to recover with a major setback at the start of World War II.

 The Post-World War II Years (1945–1954) 
After the end of the second World War, the Dow started another recovery that ultimately led to the all-time closing high set back in 1929.

The Post-World War II Boom Market (1954–1966)

The 1970s Bear Market (1972–1973)

The 1980s Bull Market (1982–1987)

The 1990s Bull Acceleration (1989–2000)

The 2000s Cyclical Bull Market (2006–2007)

The 2010s Bull Market (2013–2020)

The Early 2020s Bull Market (2020–2022)

Notes 
1This was the Dow's very first close on February 16, 1885.

2This was the Dow's close at the peak on June 4, 1890.

3This was the Dow's close at the peak on January 19, 1906.

4This was the Dow's close at the peak on November 3, 1919.

5This was the Dow's close at the peak of the 1920s bull market on Tuesday, September 3, 1929 before the stock market crash. This level would not be seen again until Tuesday, November 23, 1954, more than 25 years later.

6This was the Dow's close at the peak of March 10, 1937.

7This was the Dow's close at the peak on February 9, 1966.

8The Dow first exceeded 1,000 during the trading day on Tuesday, January 18, 1966, but dropped back before closing that day. It would take almost seven years before it finally closed above 1,000 for the first time on Tuesday, November 14, 1972.

9This was the Dow's close at the peak on January 11, 1973 before the 1973–74 stock market crash.

10This was the Dow's close at the peak of August 25, 1987 before the Black Monday stock market crash.

11The Dow reached an intraday high above 3,000 for the first time on Friday, July 13, 1990, before falling back below by the close. The average closed at 2,999.75 on Monday, July 16, 1990, and closed unchanged the following day; however, it would take until April 17 of the next year for the Dow to finally close above 3,000.

12The Dow first exceeded 4,000 during the trading day on Monday, January 31, 1994, but dropped back before closing that day. It would take just over another year before it finally closed above 4,000 for the first time on Thursday, February 23, 1995.

13The Dow first traded above 10,000 on Tuesday, March 16, 1999, but dropped back before closing that day. The Dow closed at 9,997.62 on Thursday, March 18, 1999. It would take nearly two weeks to close above 10,000 on Monday, March 29, 1999.

14This was the Dow's close at the peak on January 14, 2000 before the dot-com crash.

15This was the Dow's close at the peak on October 9, 2007 before the financial crisis of 2007–2008.

16The Dow first traded above 15,000 on Friday, May 3, 2013 but dropped back before closing that day, it then closed above 15,000 on Tuesday, May 7, 2013.

17This was the Dow's close at the peak on May 19, 2015 before the 2015-16 stock market selloff.

18The Dow first traded above 19,200 during the session on Wednesday, November 30, 2016, then flirted with the same milestone the next day.  However, Monday, December 5, 2016 was when the Dow first closed above 19,200.

19The Dow first traded above 26,000 on Tuesday, January 16, 2018 but dropped back before closing that day, it then closed above 26,000 on Wednesday, January 17, 2018.

20The Dow first traded above 29,000 on Friday, January 10, 2020 and again on Tuesday, January 14, 2020 but dropped back before closing on both days, it then closed above 29,000 on Wednesday, January 15, 2020.

21After peaking on February 12, 2020, the Dow Jones rapidly fell into correction later that same month and into bear market territory in the next month amid the COVID-19 pandemic.

22This was the fastest 1,000 point gain taking only 5 trading days from closing above 32,000 to close above 33,000.

23The Dow first traded above 35,000 on Monday, May 10, 2021 before closing below it for the day. After two and a half months worth of several attempts, the Dow finally closed above 35,000 on Friday, July 23, 2021.

Complete list of record closes
The following is a list of the record closes of the Dow Jones Industrial Average grouped by year since May 26, 1896.

1896 (7 record closes)

1897 (29 record closes)

1898 (14 record closes)

1899 (34 record closes)

1900 (0 record closes)

1901 (2 record closes)

1902–1904 (0 record closes)

1905 (31 record closes)

1906 (10 record closes)

1907–1915 (0 record closes)

1916 (14 record closes)

1917–1918 (0 record closes)

1919 (11 record closes)

1920–1923 (0 record closes)

1924 (1 record close)

1925 (65 record closes)

1926 (9 record closes)

1927 (48 record closes)

1928 (58 record closes)

1929 (33 record closes)

1930–1953 (0 record closes)

1954 (13 record closes)

1955 (49 record closes)

1956 (15 record closes)

1957 (0 record closes)

1958 (25 record closes)

1959 (39 record closes)

1960 (1 record close)

1961 (19 record closes)

1962 (0 record closes)

1963 (14 record closes)

1964 (62 record closes)

1965 (39 record closes)

1966 (8 record closes)

1967–1971 (0 record closes)

1972 (12 record closes)

1973 (4 record closes)

1974–1981 (0 record closes)

1982 (2 record closes)

1983 (30 record closes)

1984 (0 record closes)

1985 (36 record closes)

1986 (30 record closes)

1987 (55 record closes)

1988 (0 record closes)

1989 (8 record closes)

1990 (15 record closes)

1991 (11 record closes)

1992 (22 record closes)

1993 (33 record closes)

1994 (12 record closes)

1995 (69 record closes)

1996 (44 record closes)

1997 (39 record closes)

1998 (30 record closes)

1999 (35 record closes)

2000 (4 record closes)

2001–2005 (0 record closes)

2006 (22 record closes)

2007 (34 record closes)

2008–2012 (0 record closes)

2013 (52 record closes)

2014 (38 record closes)

2015 (6 record closes)

2016 (26 record closes)

2017 (71 record closes)

2018 (15 record closes)

2019 (22 record closes)

2020 (14 record closes)

2021 (45 record closes)

2022 (2 record closes)

List of 1,000-point milestones by number of trading days

List of 10,000-point milestones by number of trading days

See also 
 Closing milestones of the Nasdaq Composite
 Closing milestones of the S&P 500
 List of largest daily changes in the Dow Jones Industrial Average
 Market trend
 Stock market bubble
 Stock market crash
 Wilshire 5000
 Dow Jones Industrial Average

References

External links 
 Dow Jones Industrial Average Closing Milestones
 Century of the Dow
 MarketWatch: Recent DJIA
 DJIA on Google Finance
 DJIA on CNN Money
 DJIA Download Data